The Chicago, Milwaukee, St. Paul & Pacific Railroad-Kittitas Depot is a railroad station in Kittitas, Washington, United States, that was built in 1909 by the Chicago, Milwaukee and St. Paul (the "Milwaukee Road") as part of the railroad's Pacific Extension.

The depot is a rectangular, single-story, wood-frame building. It was built to serve the local community by shipping agricultural products. A small rail yard served the potato packing houses. In 1919, after the railroad electrified, an electric substation and operators' houses were built adjacent to the depot. In 1974, the substation was razed, and the operators' houses were sold to private individuals. After the railroad abandoned the Pacific Extension in 1980, the depot was taken over by the State of Washington and now is part of the Iron Horse State Park, a rails-to-trails initiative.

The depot was listed in the National Register because of its association with the Milwaukee Road and the development of railroads in Washington.

References
 Bruce, Robin. Chicago, Milwaukee, St. Paul and Pacific RR, Kittitas Depot (Kittitas County, Washington) National Register of Historic Places Registration Form. Washington, DC: US Department of the Interior, National Park Service, 1992. On file at the National Register of Historic Places, Washington, DC; and at the State of Washington Office of Archaeology and Historic Preservation, Olympia, Washington.
Holstein, Craig, Robin Bruce, and Charles Mutschler. . National Register of Historic Places Multiple Property Documentation Form. On file at the National Park Service, Washington, DC. 1992.

External links
Webshots: photos
Listing on U.S. National Register of Historic Places
City of Kittitas: photo

Kittitas, Washington
Railway stations in the United States opened in 1909
Railway stations on the National Register of Historic Places in Washington (state)
Transportation buildings and structures in Kittitas County, Washington
National Register of Historic Places in Kittitas County, Washington